Mansfield Woodhouse is a settlement about  north of Mansfield in Nottinghamshire, England, along the main A60 road in a wide, low valley between the Rivers Maun and Meden. Founded before the Roman Empire, it is noteworthy for its stone-built centre.

Originally separate with its own urban district council, after continuous development it has become a large part of the Mansfield Urban Area. After the Local Government Act 1972, Mansfield Woodhouse and Warsop Urban District Councils merged with the Municipal Borough of Mansfield on 1 April 1974, to form a new local government area known as Mansfield District Council. Mansfield Woodhouse's economy was traditionally based on the quarrying, mining, farming and textile industries.

History
The Romans had a fortress and a civilian settlement in the area (remains of a Roman villa were famously found here by Hayman Rooke in the 1780s). The area declined after the Romans left but by the 13th century, there was a growing settlement of smallholders.

On 12 September 1304, fire destroyed the settlement, including its timber-framed church. The settlement was rebuilt using local materials and the new stone-built church, Church of St Edmund, Mansfield Woodhouse, still stands.

The settlement recovered and by Tudor times, was home to a number of wealthy families. Farming and quarrying were the main livelihoods and Mansfield Woodhouse also prospered with the growth of the textile and hosiery trades into the 19th century.

In 1839 the designer of the present Houses of Parliament, Sir Charles Barry, selected a sand-coloured magnesian limestone as the stone that would be used in its construction. This was quarried in Anston, South Yorkshire as well as in Mansfield Woodhouse.

On the road to Edwinstowe stands the Parliament Oak, which, according to legend, was once the location of a session of Parliament held by a king. There is a commemorative plaque.

During the UK miners' strike, some coal miners at nearby Sherwood Colliery on the edge of Mansfield Woodhouse continued working, a decision made with members and officials as part of the Union of Democratic Mineworkers, a breakaway from the National Union of Mineworkers. The pit closed in 1992. The Colliery's football and cricket teams carry on through Sherwood Colliery Football Club and Sherwood Colliery Cricket Club, with the former swimming pool that was part of the original pit head baths complex being renamed as Rebecca Adlington Swimming Centre in 2010.

Natives of Mansfield Woodhouse include D'Ewes Coke (1747–1811), an unusual combination of clergyman and colliery master, and the pianist and composer John Ogdon (1937–89).

Today

The settlement was recorded as having a population of over 18,500 according to the 2011 census.

It has a number of schools; the larger primary schools are St. Edmund's Church of England Primary School, Northfield Primary and Nursery School, Peafield Lane Primary and Nursery School, Leas Park Junior School and Nettleworth Primary and Nursery School.

The largest school is The Manor Academy; originally a grammar school (opened in 1959), it merged with Forest View Secondary Modern (opened 1956 – both at Park Hall Road) and Yorke Street Secondary Modern to form a comprehensive school, opened in September 1973. The Yorke Street building was about a mile away to the south.

After a fire in 1996, the Park Hall Road buildings were enlarged during rebuilding to incorporate the former Yorke Street facility, which was sold for housing land. Near the school is The Manor Sport and Recreation Centre, a public amenity which forms part of the school's facilities.

The Co-op in Mansfield Woodhouse closed on in January 2009, and was replaced by a Morrisons store in June 2009. The area is being redeveloped in other areas, including replacement of the older terraced housing around Thoresby Road, near the railway station and from Sherwood Street–Blake Street with new housing estates. A new police station has served the area since 2007; however, it was earmarked for possible closure in 2013, by Nottinghamshire Police Commissioner Paddy Tipping.

The area is served by Mansfield Woodhouse railway station, on the Robin Hood Line.

The area also has a volunteer-run newsletter called The Woodhouse Warbler, produced quarterly since late 2000, with a circulation in the thousands. It also produced a magazine collating locals' Second World War memories, funded by the Big Lottery Fund.

Sport

The Manor Sport and Recreation Centre is a £1.9 million indoor and outdoor sports facility opened on 11 May 2002, largely funded by a £1.4 million Sport England Sports Lottery grant, with the remainder from a variety of organisations and sponsors.

First mooted by Mansfield District Council advertising for volunteer organisers in August 2012, a weekly running event was envisaged in collaboration with Nottinghamshire County Council and Manor Academy.

From 29 September 2012 the Manor Park, adjacent to the Sports complex accessed from Kingsley Avenue, has regularly hosted a Park Run – an informal, timed  fun-run for any class of participant.

Mansfield Woodhouse is known around Nottinghamshire for its junior football clubs: Woodhouse Colts JFC and Manor 4th FC, both of which offer football to youngsters from 6 to 18.

Speedway racing, then known as dirt track racing, took place at Mansfield Woodhouse in the pioneer days of 1928.

References

External links 

 Mansfield Woodhouse Genealogy & Census Information
 Mansfield Woodhouse Community Website
 The Woodhouse Warbler Website
 Chesterton Humberts, History of The Priory and Debdale, Mansfield Woodhouse
 The Manor Academy, formerly known as Manor Comprehensive School
 The Manor Sport and Recreation Centre

Villages in Nottinghamshire
Unparished areas in Nottinghamshire
Mansfield District